Veliko Selo is a suburban settlement of Belgrade, Serbia. It is located in the Belgrade's municipality of Palilula.

Location 
Veliko Selo is located in the southern, Šumadija section of the municipality, 12 kilometers east of downtown Belgrade.  As the easternmost settlement in the municipality of Palilula it is the ending point of the Slanački put (Slanci road) which connects it with Belgrade.  The settlement is built on the southern slopes of the hill of Milićevo brdo (279 m), in the micro-valley of the short creek of Vrelski potok.  In Serbian, its name means big village.

Population 
Veliko Selo is depopulating: 1,767 inhabitants by the 1991 Census and 1,676 by the 2002 Census. Ethnic structure (2002 Census): Serbs 96,66%, Romani 0,77%.

History 

With the expansion of the population of jackals in the outskirts of Belgrade since the 2000s, the animals were reported in Veliko Selo in the early 2022.

Economy 
The settlement is officially classified as a rural (village) as the economy is entirely agricultural.  East and north of the settlement extensive fields and hoop houses produce fruits and especially vegetables for the population of Belgrade: lettuce, onions, cabbage and zucchini.

Agricultural lands are very often flooded by the Danube (about 2 kilometers away from Veliko Selo) as there is no defense from the floods on this section of  the river's right bank.  This area is called Velikoselski Rit (the Veliko Selo marsh) and by the general urbanistic plan for the development of Belgrade by the year 2021, it is projected as the future new city port, but so far nothing has been done in this direction.

Water treatment facility 

By 2019, Belgrade remained the only larger city on the Danube without the sewage treatment plant. Yearly,  of sewage is directly poured in two rivers of Belgrade, the Sava and the Danube. In May 2019, city administration decided to build the facility in Veliko Selo. The central part of the system will be the main interceptor sewer, which would collect the sewage from almost the entire urban section of the city: old section between the Sava and the Danube, Kumodraž, Mali Mokri Lug, left bank of the Sava, New Belgrade and Zemun up to the industrial zone in the Batajnica direction. The facility will be located at the extreme downstream position of the entire system, in the Velikoselski Rit.

Though four additional treatment facilities were planned in the city (Krnjača, Batajnica, Ostružnica and Vinča), this one will be the largest, treating 80% of the city sewage. Construction of the main interceptor which is to conduct sewage to Veliko Selo began in the mid-1980s. Still, as of 2019, only half of the interceptor network has been built, so the construction of the treatment facility is constantly being postponed. In January 2023, the Ministry of Construction, Transportation and Infrastructure announced launching of the works for some time in 2023.

References 

Suburbs of Belgrade
Šumadija
Palilula, Belgrade